Koti ja Yhteiskunta (Finnish: Home and Society) was a monthly women's magazine which was published in Helsinki in the period 1889–1911. It was the official media outlet of the Finnish Women’s Association.

History and profile
Koti ja Yhteiskunta was first published on 14 April 1889. The founder was Alexandra Gripenberg who also edited the magazine which covered both political writings and domestic articles. She was the sole editor-in-chief of the magazine until 1911 and published various articles. Her writings mostly covered the achievements of women in different countries.

Koti ja Yhteiskunta was published by the Finnish Women’s Association on a monthly basis. The magazine opposed to women's having sex and children before marriage and denounced the working-class and rural women who were frequently practising these. It also regarded female servants as a threat for family life and demanded that female servants should be tested for sexually transmitted diseases. After producing a total 273 issues Koti ja Yhteiskunta ceased publication on 31 December 1911.

References

1889 establishments in Finland
1911 disestablishments in Finland
Defunct magazines published in Finland
Feminism in Finland
Feminist magazines
Finnish-language magazines
Magazines established in 1889
Magazines disestablished in 1911
Magazines published in Helsinki
Monthly magazines published in Finland
Women's magazines published in Finland